Dalton Guthrie (born December 23, 1995) is an American professional baseball infielder and outfielder for the Philadelphia Phillies of Major League Baseball (MLB). He played college baseball for the Florida Gators. Guthrie was selected in the 6th round of the 2017 Major League Baseball draft by the Phillies. He made his MLB debut in September 2022.

Early life
Guthrie is the son of former 15-year major league pitcher Mark Guthrie, and is Jewish. He grew up in Sarasota, Florida.

Guthrie attended Venice High School. Playing baseball in high school, he was a two-time all-state and all-state academic team selection at shortstop. In his senior year he was one of nine players in the U.S. named to the 2014 Rawlings High School Gold Glove Team, was chosen as the 2014 Florida Dairy Farmers Player of the Year for Class 6A, and was named the Sarasota Herald-Tribune Player of the Year.

College career
Guthrie played college baseball for the Florida Gators, where he was a three-year starter. He was named a freshman All-American and to the Southeastern Conference (SEC) All-Freshman team after hitting .287/.362/.365 with 81 hits and starting at second base. Guthrie moved to shortstop and batted leadoff as a sophomore and was named second team All-SEC and to the SEC All-Defensive Team after leading the Gators with a .305 batting average with 85 hits (6th in the Southeastern Conference) and six sacrifice flies (third). 

He underwent ulnar nerve transposition surgery in the fall of 2016. In 2017 Guthrie batted .273/.349/.356, with 11 stolen bases (10th) and six sacrifice flies (third), and was named to the 2017 SEC All-Defensive Team. In his college career, he played 127 games at shortstop, and 69 games at second base.

Professional career

2017-21
Guthrie was selected in the 6th round of the 2017 Major League Baseball draft by the Philadelphia Phillies. After signing with the team for a signing bonus of $350,000, he was assigned to the Gulf Coast League Phillies with whom he had 22 at bats, where he also began the 2018 season (11 at bats) before being reassigned to the Class A Lakewood Blue Claws, for whom he batted .241/.296/.342 in 307 at bats with six sacrifice hits (9th in the South Atlantic League) and seven sacrifice flies (third). Guthrie spent the 2019 season with the Clearwater Threshers of the Class A-Advanced Florida State League and batted .243/.284/.362 in 301 at bats. 

After not playing in 2020 due to the cancelation of the minor league season, Guthrie started 2021 with the Double-A Reading Fightin Phils, for whom he batted .242/.317/.364 in 165 at bats.  He was promoted to the Triple-A Lehigh Valley IronPigs, for whom he batted .292/.329/.439 with 13 doubles in 130 at bats.

2022-present
Guthrie was assigned to Lehigh Valley to start the 2022 season. With Lehigh Valley in 2022, he batted .302/.363/.476 in 338 at bats with 27 doubles (7th in the International League), 9 hit by pitch (8th), and 21 stolen bases (11th). He played 59 games in center field, 25 in right field, two each at shortstop, second base, and DH, and one each at third base and left field. He was named a 2022 MiLB Organization All Star.

The Phillies selected Guthrie's contract on September 4, 2022, and promoted him to the active roster. He made his Major League debut on September 6, starting in right field and going 0-3 in a 3-2 win over the Miami Marlins. Guthrie hit an RBI single off of Patrick Corbin on September 9, for the first hit of his career and finished the game with two hits and two RBIs in three at-bats in a 5-3 win over the Washington Nationals.

In his rookie season in 2022, Guthrie was 7-for-21 with six walks and a home run, and played 12 games in right field, one game at third base, and one game at second base.

See also
List of Jewish baseball players

References

External links

Florida Gators bio

1995 births
Living people
Baseball players from Florida
Clearwater Threshers players
Florida Complex League Phillies players
Florida Gators baseball players
Jewish American baseball players
Jewish Major League Baseball players
Lakewood BlueClaws players
Lehigh Valley IronPigs players
Major League Baseball infielders
Major League Baseball outfielders
Philadelphia Phillies players
Reading Fightin Phils players
Sportspeople from Sarasota, Florida